This page is about the Croton River watershed, a hydrological feature. For the  component of the New York City water supply system with a similar name, see Croton Watershed

The Croton River watershed is the drainage basin of the Croton River and its seven tributary rivers, a hydrological feature in southeastern New York State.

Largely physically overlapping the  New York City water supply system's Croton Watershed, the Croton River watershed represents the drainage and flow of some seven rivers, one dozen reservoirs, three controlled lakes, large Lake Mahopac, and countless smaller lakes and ponds.

The vast majority of this water ends up at the Jerome Park Reservoir in the Bronx via the New Croton Aqueduct, from which it is distributed to New York City.  Water in excess of the City's needs spills over the New Croton Dam at the New Croton Reservoir and is carried by the Croton River into the Hudson River at Croton-on-Hudson, New York, about 30 miles north of the Metropolitan area.

Definition 

The Croton River watershed is a hydrological feature, the   drainage basin of the Croton River and its tributaries. It is not synonymous with the Croton Watershed, a term describing the rivers, reservoirs, dams, pump systems, and other infrastructure of the southernmost watershed of the New York City water supply system. Numerous small natural lakes and ponds, as well as large Lake Mahopac, are within the river's watershed but not owned, leased, or controlled by the City water supply system (even though they too ultimately drain into it). A map of the actual Croton Watershed is found here.

The Croton River is a river in southern New York with three principal tributaries: the West Branch, Middle Branch, and East Branch.  Their waters, all part of the City water supply system, join downstream from the Croton Falls Reservoir. Together, their waters and the reservoirs linked to them represent the northern half of the New York City water system's Croton Watershed.

Shortly after the confluence of the three Croton River branches the Croton River proper, along with its tributary, the Muscoot River, flow into the Muscoot Reservoir, after which it empties into the New Croton Reservoir, which feeds the New Croton Aqueduct supplying water to New York City via the Jerome Park Reservoir in the Bronx.

Watershed

Waterways
 Croton River
 West Branch
 Middle Branch
 East Branch
 Titicus River
 Muscoot River
 Cross River

Lakes and ponds
 Lake Mahopac
 Lake Carmel
 Long Pond (Carmel)

Reservoirs
 Boyds Corner
 West Branch
 Middle Branch
 Croton Falls / Diverting
 East Branch / Bog Brook
 Titicus
 Cross River
 Amawalk
 Muscoot
 New Croton

Controlled lakes
 Kirk
 Gilead
 Gleneida

Aqueduct
 The New Croton Aqueduct, completed in 1890, brings water from the New Croton Reservoir in Westchester and Putnam counties.

Recreation
Limited recreation is permitted within the Croton Watershed.  Its guidelines and requirements are listed here.

Notes

See also
 Old Croton aqueduct
 Water supply network

References

External links
 NYC DEP Watershed Recreation

Water infrastructure of New York City
Watersheds of the United States